Kendriya Vidyalaya No. 3 Agra is a school in Agra, Uttar Pradesh, which is part of Kendriya Vidyalaya Sangathan system of schools. It is administered through KVS Agra region which works under the direct guidance of Ministry of Human Resource and Development. The school is affiliated with the Central Board of Secondary Education.

References

External links 

Kendriya Vidyalaya Sangathan

Kendriya Vidyalayas in Uttar Pradesh
Education in Agra